Don't Call may refer to:

 "Don't Call", a 2009 song by Desire from II
 "Don't Call", a 2017 song by Lost Kings